The 1920 APFA season was the inaugural season of the American Professional Football Association, renamed the National Football League in 1922. An agreement to form a league was made by four independent teams from Ohio on August 20, 1920, at Ralph Hay's office in Canton, Ohio, with plans to invite owners of more teams for a second meeting on September 17.<ref>"Football Managers Make Plans", Akron (O.) Beacon Journal", August 21, 1920, p10</ref>  The "American Professional Football Conference" (APFC) was made up of Hay's Canton Bulldogs, Akron Pros, the Cleveland Tigers and the Dayton Triangles, who decided on a six-game schedule to play each other at home-and-away, an agreement to respect each other's player contracts, and to take a stand against signing college students whose class had not yet graduated."NFL Announces Plans to Celebrate 100th Season", NFL.com, August 1, 2019    

A second organizational meeting was held in Canton on September 17, with the original four APFC clubs, as well as a fifth Ohio team that had played informally in what historians later dubbed the "Ohio League" (the Columbus Panhandles) and four teams from Illinois (Chicago Cardinals and Chicago Tigers, Decatur Staleys, and Rock Island Independents), two from Indiana (Hammond Pros and Muncie Flyers), two from 
New York (Buffalo All-Americans and Rochester Jeffersons), and the Detroit Heralds from Michigan for a total of 14.  At the meeting, the name of the league became the American Professional Football Association. Four other teams also joined the Association during the year. Meanwhile, Jim Thorpe of the Canton Bulldogs was named the APFA's first president but continued to play for the team.

Scheduling was left up to each team: there were wide variations, both in the overall number of games played, and in the number played against other Association members. Thus, no official standings were maintained. In addition, football teams in the APFA also faced independent football teams not associated with the league.

For instance, the Rochester Jeffersons played a schedule consisting mostly of local teams from their local sandlot circuit and the NYPFL, not the APFA.

The Akron Pros ended the season as the only undefeated team in the Association. Despite this, two one-loss teams, the Decatur Staleys and Buffalo All-Americans, who both tied Akron that year, made cases for a co-championship. 

At the league meeting in Akron on April 30, 1921, the Pros were awarded the Brunswick-Balke Collender Cup for the 1920 season, the only year the trophy was used. Had modern NFL tie-breaking rules been in force in 1920, the Buffalo All-Americans (9–1–1) would have been co-champions with the Akron Pros (8–0–3), as both teams had a win percentage of .864 and their only game was tied, while the Staleys (10–1–2) would have finished third with .846. In this regard, if games against non-APFA teams are excluded, Akron (6–0–3) would still have won the championship with .833, but the All-Americans (4–1–1) and the Staleys (5–1–2) would have finished equal second with .750 as they did not play each other.

Of the 14 teams that played in the APFA/NFL's inaugural season, the Chicago Cardinals, now the Arizona Cardinals, and the Decatur Staleys, now the Chicago Bears, are the only teams that remain in the league.

 Formation 

Prior to the APFA, there were several other loose, professional organizations; most of the APFA teams were from either the Ohio League or the New York Pro Football League. On August 20, 1920, a meeting attended by representatives of four Ohio League teams—Ralph Hay and Jim Thorpe for the Canton Bulldogs, Jimmy O'Donnell and Stan Cofall for the Cleveland Tigers, Carl Storck for the Dayton Triangles, and Frank Nied and Art Ranney for the Akron Pros—was held. At the meeting, the representatives tentatively agreed to call their new league the American Professional Football Conference, introduce a salary cap for the teams, and not to sign college players nor players under contract with another team.Siwoff, Zimmber & Marini (2010), pp. 352–353 According to the Canton Evening Repository, the purpose of the league was to "raise the standard of professional football in every way possible, to eliminate bidding for players between rival clubs and to secure cooperation in the formation of schedules, at least for the bigger teams." The representatives then contacted other major professional teams and invited them to a meeting for September 17.

At that meeting, held at Bulldogs owner Ralph Hay's Hupmobile showroom in Canton, Ohio, representatives of the Rock Island Independents, the Muncie Flyers, the Decatur Staleys, the Racine Cardinals, the Massillon Tigers, the Chicago Tigers, and the Hammond Pros agreed to join the league. Representatives of the Buffalo All-Americans and Rochester Jeffersons could not attend the meeting, but sent letters to Hay asking to be included in the league. Team representatives changed the league's name slightly to the American Professional Football Association and elected officers, installing Thorpe as president, Cofall as vice-president, Ranney as secretary-treasurer. Under the new league structure, teams created their schedules dynamically as the season progressed, so there were no minimum or maximum number of games needed to be played.Davis (2005), p. 59 Also, representatives of each team voted to determine the winner of the APFA trophy.

Teams
The APFA had 14 teams that played during its inaugural season.

 Schedule 
The regular-season schedule was not fixed but was created dynamically by each team as the season progressed. The first game involving an APFA team occurred on September 26, when the Rock Island Independents beat the St. Paul Ideals 48–0.

The first official game between APFA (NFL) members occurred on October 3, when the Dayton Triangles beat the Columbus Panhandles 14-0.  The Triangles' Lou Partlow scored the league's first touchdown and George "Hobby" Kinderline kicked the first extra point.  A historic marker placed by the Ohio Historical Society at Triangle Park in Dayton marks the location of that first ever game.

The final game of the season was a 14–14 tie between the Chicago Cardinals and the non-league Chicago Stayms on December 19, 1920. The Decatur Staleys and the Canton Bulldogs played the most games in the season (13), while the Muncie Flyers played the fewest (1). The Buffalo All-Americans scored the most points all season (258), and the Akron Pros allowed the fewest points (7).

 Final standings 

 Postseason and legacy 

As there was no playoff system in the APFA until 1932, a meeting was held to determine the 1920 Champions. Each team that showed up had a vote to determine the champions. Since the Akron Pros never lost a game, the Pros were awarded the Brunswick-Balke Collender Cup on April 30, 1921. The trophy was a "silver loving cup", donated by the Brunswick-Balke-Collender Company. This decision, however, would arise with controversy. The Staleys and the All-Americans each stated that they should win the award because they had more wins and were not beaten by the Akron Pros. Each player from the Pros was also awarded with a golden fob; this was in the shape of a football and inscribed with "1920", "WORLD CHAMPIONS", and each player's first initial and last name. The Pros did not officially celebrate their championship season until the following year. In October 1921, most of the team was invited to the Elks Club of Akron, which was labeled as "a grand homecoming celebration for the world's champions". Fritz Pollard was congratulated during an Akron Merchants Association of Colored Business Men's meeting.

The Pros were the first team in the history of the APFA to complete a non-modern "perfect season". Only four other teams have since accomplished this feat: the 1922 Canton Bulldogs at 10–0–2, the 1923 Canton Bulldogs at 11–0–1, the 1929 Green Bay Packers at 12–0–1, and the 1972 Miami Dolphins at 17–0–0. In 1972, the NFL changed the rules, so ties count as a half-win and a half-loss.

Even though the Pros were given the trophy in 1920, the league lost track of the event, and for a long time published in its own record books that the 1920 championship was undecided. It was not until the 1970s that the NFL discovered this early vote on awarding the Akron Pros the championship.

 Awards 

 All-Pro 

Bruce Copeland, sportswriter for the Rock Island Argus'', compiled the All-Pro list for 1920. He used the games played in Rock Island, other newspapers, and his own memory to determine the first-, second-, and third-team All-Pro list. Pro-Football-Reference.com uses this list as the official All-Pro list of 1920. Twenty of the players were from Illinois and thirteen were from Ohio. The Rock Island Independents had the most players on the list (9), and Racine Cardinals had the least (1).

 First-Team All-Pro

 Second-Team All-Pro

 Third-Team All-Pro

Hall of Fame 

As of 2012, 10 players have been enshrined in the Pro Football Hall of Fame who played in the 1920 APFA season. One non-player, Joseph Carr, the owner of the Columbus Panhandles in the 1920 season and league president from 1921–1939, was also elected to the Hall.

Notes

References 
 
 
 
 
 
 
 
Ziemba, Joe (1999). When Football Was Football: The Chicago Cardinals and the Birth of the NFL. Chicago: Triumph Books. .

National Football League seasons
 
National Football League controversies